Kulture Jazz is an album by American jazz trumpeter and composer Wadada Leo Smith, recorded in 1993 and released on the ECM label. Smith had already recorded as a leader on the ECM label with 1979's Divine Love.

Reception

The AllMusic review by Eugene Chadbourne states: "The ECM folks do much better by Wadada Leo Smith than ever before with this solo recording, a true masterwork of its kind and one of the purest, most enlightening demonstrations of the connected natures of folk, blues, jazz, and creative music". A reviewer of Jazz Desk stated: "This album is something like the musical equivalent of someone building his own house or boat or sewing his own clothes. It is Wadada Leo Smith alone in the studio playing trumpet, harmonica, bamboo flute, percussions, Asian and African instruments and singing. The music is very personal and at times almost has a meditative quality."

Track listing
All compositions by Wadada Leo Smith
 "Don't You Remember?" - 3:42   
 "Kulture of Jazz" - 5:33   
 "Song of Humanity (Kanto Pri Homaro)" - 3:36   
 "Fire-Sticks, Chrysanthemums and Moonlight (For Harumi)" - 3:42   
 "Seven Rings of Light in the Hola Trinity" - 2:26   
 "Louis Armstrong Counterpointing" - 2:43   
 "Albert Ayler in a Spiritual Light" - 4:44   
 "The Kemet Omega Reigns (For Billie Holiday)" - 5:02   
 "Love Supreme (For John Coltrane)" - 3:56   
 "Mississippi Delta Sunrise (For Bobbie)" - 3:55   
 "Mother: Sarah Brown-Smith-Wallace (1920-92)" - 4:06   
 "The Healer's Voyage on the Sacred River (For Ayl Kwel Armah)" - 3:46   
 "Uprising (For Jessie and Yvonne)" - 5:05  
Recorded at Hardstudios in Winterthur, Switzerland in October 1992

Personnel
Wadada Leo Smith - trumpet, flugelhorn, koto, mbira, harmonica, bamboo notch flute, percussion, vocals

References

ECM Records albums
Wadada Leo Smith albums
1993 albums